Spahn Ranch is the eponymously-titled debut EP by Spahn Ranch, released on October 16, 1992 by Cleopatra Records. The album was mostly a vehicle for founding member Matt Green and Rob Morton, who had been composing together for nearly five years before being signed to Cleopatra.

Track listing

Personnel
Adapted from the Spahn Ranch liner notes.

Spahn Ranch
 Scott Franklin (as Chopper Franklin) – lead vocals
 Matt Green – guitar, bass guitar
 Rob Morton – sampler, programming, production

Production and design
 Rod O'Brien – production, engineering, mixing
 Christopher Payne – cover art, illustrations, design

Release history

References

External links 
 Spahn Ranch at Discogs (list of releases)

1992 debut EPs
Spahn Ranch (band) albums
Cleopatra Records EPs